Mubadala Investment Company PJSC, or simply Mubadala, is an Emirati state-owned holding company that acts as a sovereign wealth fund. The company was established in 2017 when then-named Mubadala Development Company (now Mamoura Diversified Global Holding) and the International Petroleum Investment Company (IPIC) merged.

History
Established in 1984, International Petroleum Investment Company (IPIC) was created to advance Abu Dhabi’s natural petroleum wealth for the development of the emirate. Mubadala Development Company followed in 2002 to further diversify the economy.
In June 2016, it was announced that Mubadala Development Company would merge with the International Petroleum Investment Company. In 2017, ownership of both MDC and IPIC was transferred to a newly-created parent company, Mubadala Investment Company. The company is a wholly owned investment vehicle of the government of Abu Dhabi, in the United Arab Emirates, and Sheikh Mohamed bin Zayed, the current ruler of Abu Dhabi and President of the United Arab Emirates, is a chairman in the company.

Investments and ventures
Mubadala has a ventures unit called Mubadala Ventures. Mubadala has invested in logistics software startup Turvo, Alphabet-owned self-driving technology company Waymo, Reliance Jio Platforms, UK life sciences company Envision, and Telegram. Mubadala is a parent company of GlobalFoundries, a semiconductor foundry company.

The company owns stakes in numerous companies, including a 6.9 percent share in AMD, and a 7.5 percent share in the Carlyle Group. In 2021, Mubadala purchased a 2.6% stake in En+ Group, a manufacturer of green aluminum, from Polina Yumasheva, the former wife of Russian businessman Oleg Deripaska. The same year, Mubadala purchased MetrôRio, the company that holds the operations for the Rio de Janeiro metro, from Invepar.

A unit of the company, Mubadala Capital, invested €50 million in the Novalpina Capital private equity fund of €1 billion, which bought the NSO Group in 2019. Reports revealed that the UAE targeted human rights activists, journalists and Princess Haya using the Pegasus spyware, during the same time. Mubadala Capital got a seat on Novalpina’s committee of largest investors. 

Mubadala capital an investment company owned by Abu Dhabi has been a top investor in Israeli cyber weapons maker NSO Group since 2019 with an investment of €50mn.

In May 2022, Mubadala Investment Company signed a preliminary agreement with French utility Engie for the development of a digital platform to charge electric vehicles in the UAE and across the Middle East. The two companies would also explore areas related to sustainable mobility.

Mubadala Technology

The company's Advanced Technology Investment Company (ATIC) in 2008, is an investment company in the high-technology sector. ATIC owns the semiconductor foundry companies GlobalFoundries, and Chartered Semiconductor Manufacturing (which later merged with GlobalFoundries). ATIC has invested in Calxeda, a start-up company for producing ARM architecture-based computers for the server market. In 2011, ATIC announced investments of $5.5 billion to expand chip manufacturing in Singapore, Dresden, and New York. It  also announced a $6–$8 billion computer chip factory in Abu Dhabi  for completion in 2012. The company supports research initiatives in Khalifa University, UAE University, American University of Sharjah, Masdar Institute and New York University Abu Dhabi. In 2014, ATIC became Mubadala Technology.

Mubadala Energy 
Mubadala Energy (formerly Mubadala Petroleum) plan to expand into LNG, blue hydrogen and carbon capture. Mubadala Energy works in eleven markets and employs over 500 people.

References

External links
 Mubadala Investment Company
 ATIC official website
 Mubadala Investment Company SWFI Profile

Financial services companies established in 2017
Government-owned companies of Abu Dhabi
Investment companies of the United Arab Emirates
Sovereign wealth funds
Emirati companies established in 2017